Thaman Gurung VC (2 October 1924 – 10 November 1944) was a Nepalese Gurkha recipient of the Victoria Cross, the highest and most prestigious award for gallantry in the face of the enemy that can be awarded to British and Commonwealth forces.

Details
He was 20 years old, and a Rifleman in the 1st Battalion,  5th Royal Gurkha Rifles (Frontier Force), in the Indian Army during World War II when the following deed took place for which he was awarded the VC.

The citation in the London Gazette reads:

The medal
His medals are not publicly held.

Notes

See also
List of Brigade of Gurkhas recipients of the Victoria Cross

References
 Monuments to Courage (David Harvey, 1999)
 The Register of the Victoria Cross (This England, 1997)

External links
Thaman Gurung

1924 births
1944 deaths
Nepalese World War II recipients of the Victoria Cross
British Indian Army soldiers
Nepalese people of World War II
Nepalese recipients of the Victoria Cross
Indian Army personnel killed in World War II
Nepalese Buddhists
Gurkhas
Gurung people